Ashish Chakrapani is an English cricketer. He made his List A debut on 22 July 2021, for Warwickshire in the 2021 Royal London One-Day Cup. He also played at the Birmingham League Premier.

References

External links
 

Year of birth missing (living people)
Living people
English cricketers
Warwickshire cricketers
Place of birth missing (living people)